Abdel Malek El Hasnaoui (pronunciation: [ʕæbdɛlˈmælɪk ʔɛlˈħæsnawi]; born 9 February 1994) is a Dutch professional football player of Moroccan-Berber descent who plays as a midfielder for OFC Oostzaan.

Club career

Born in Amsterdam, El Hasnaoui joined the Ajax Academy in 2002. He began his early career as an attacking midfielder but also frequently played as a winger. In the 2011–12 season, El Hasnaoui helped his Ajax A1 youth team win the Nike Eredivisie league title as well as finish runners-up to Inter Milan in the NextGen Series after losing on penalties (5–3) following a 1–1 deadlock after extra time.

El Hasnaoui signed his first professional contract on 31 May 2012, in a two-year deal binding him to the club until 30 June 2014. He played for Jong Ajax in the 2012–13 Beloften Eredivisie season. Jong Ajax were promoted to the Eerste Divisie for the 2013–14 season and El Hasnaoui made his professional debut in a 2–1 league win over Jong Twente on 30 August 2013.

On 2 September 2019 it was confirmed, that El Hasnaoui had joined Dutch Hoofdklasse club Sportlust '46.

International career
El Hasnaoui holds both Dutch and Moroccan citizenship and is still eligible to represent either country at international level. He received his first Netherlands U-19 cap in a match against Malta on 9 October 2012.

Career statistics

Honours

Club
Ajax A1 (under-19)
 Nike Eredivisie: 2011–12
 NextGen Series Runner-up: 2011–12

References

External links
 
 Netherlands U19 stats at OnsOranje
 
 Abdel Malek El Hasnaoui at Footballdatabase

1994 births
Living people
Dutch footballers
Netherlands youth international footballers
Moroccan footballers
Berber Moroccans
Moroccan expatriate footballers
Dutch people of Moroccan-Berber descent
Footballers from Amsterdam
AFC Ajax players
Jong Ajax players
PEC Zwolle players
Jong AZ players
FC Eindhoven players
Chabab Rif Al Hoceima players
Botola players
Eredivisie players
Eerste Divisie players
Association football midfielders
Sportlust '46 players
OFC Oostzaan players